The Swan is a lounge chair and sofa designed by Arne Jacobsen in the Danish modern style in 1958 for the Radisson SAS Royal Hotel in Copenhagen. It is manufactured by Danish furniture manufacturer Republic of Fritz Hansen.

Along with the Swan, Jacobsen also developed the Egg chair and other furniture much of which did not get into mass production, like the Drop. The Swan couch is still in production.

Jacobsen not only used the Swan for the SAS Royal Hotel, he also used it for his following projects like Danmarks Nationalbank.


Manufacture and materials
The Swan has been in production at Fritz Hansen ever since. It is available in several types of leather and fabric upholstery. The base is always star shaped in satin polished aluminium.

See also
Other chairs by Jacobsen include:
Ant (chair)
Model 3107 chair
Tongue chair

References

External links

1958 in art
Arne Jacobsen furniture
Chairs
Individual models of furniture